Carex dimorpholepis is a tussock-forming species of perennial sedge in the family Cyperaceae. It is native to temperate parts of Asia from Pakistan in the west to Japan in the east.

See also
List of Carex species

References

dimorpholepis
Plants described in 1855
Taxa named by Ernst Gottlieb von Steudel
Flora of Assam (region)
Flora of China
Flora of Japan
Flora of Korea
Flora of Manchuria
Flora of Nepal
Flora of Pakistan
Flora of Myanmar
Flora of Thailand
Flora of Vietnam